Joan Jordi Miralles (Huesca, 1977) is a Spanish novelist in Catalan language. He is also a playwright and screenwriter. His first novel won the 2004 Andròmina Prize and this most recent one was awarded the 2017 Joanot Martorell Prize.

Works
 Aglutinació (Edicions 62, 2018)
 Els nens feliços (Males Herbes, 2016)
 Una dona meravellosa (LaBreu, 2014)
 Això és Àustria (Lleonard Muntaner, 2012)
 L'úter de la balena (Moll, 2010)
 L'Altíssim (Tres i Quatre, 2005)

References

 

Living people
1977 births
Writers from Catalonia